Axius River may refer to:
 The Vardar, a river in Macedonia and Greece
 The Orontes, a river in Lebanon, Syria, and Turkey